Timeline of the liberation of the primary cities of France between 1943 and 1945.

References 
 Notes

 Footnotes

France in World War II
French Resistance